The 2010 LG Hockey Games will be held in Stockholm, Sweden, from 29 April to 2 May. The games will be played in Globen. One match will be played in Helsinki, Finland. The tournament is a part of the 2009–10 Euro Hockey Tour. Finland won the tournament before Russia and Sweden.

Standings

Fixtures

See also
LG Hockey Games

References

External links
Hockeyarchives 

2009–10 Euro Hockey Tour
2009–10 in Swedish ice hockey
2009–10 in Russian ice hockey
2009–10 in Finnish ice hockey
2009–10 in Czech ice hockey
Sweden Hockey Games
April 2010 sports events in Europe
May 2010 sports events in Europe
2010s in Stockholm